Simranjit Singh Hundal is an Indian film director, writer working in Punjabi film industry

Career 
Hundal started his career in 2002 and In 2013 before landing his first notable role in the Movie Jatt Boys -Putt Jattan De, for which he was nominated and won the PTC Punjabi Film Awards 2014 - Best Debut Director.  He has directed more than 200 music videos and three movies including Gun & Goal and 25 Kille.

Filmography

Music Videos

Awards and nominations

References

External links
 

Year of birth missing (living people)
Punjabi-language film directors